Ihor Korotetskiy (born 13 September 1987) is a professional Ukrainian football defender who last played for Sabail FK in Azerbaijan Premier League.

Career

Club
On 14 January 2020, Korotetskiy left Sabail FK by mutual consent.

References

External links
 Official Website Profile
 Profile on EUFO
 Profile on Football Squads
 
 

1987 births
Living people
Ukrainian footballers
Ukrainian Premier League players
Azerbaijan Premier League players
FC Zorya Luhansk players
FC Shakhtar Donetsk players
FC Kryvbas Kryvyi Rih players
FC Mariupol players
FC Metalurh Donetsk players
FC Metalurh Zaporizhzhia players
FC Hoverla Uzhhorod players
FC Shakhtar-2 Donetsk players
FC Ahal players
Kapaz PFK players
Sabail FK players
Ukrainian expatriate footballers
Expatriate footballers in Turkmenistan
Ukrainian expatriate sportspeople in Turkmenistan
Expatriate footballers in Azerbaijan
Ukrainian expatriate sportspeople in Azerbaijan
Association football defenders
Footballers from Kharkiv